Bayalu Daari is a 1976 Indian Kannada-language film directed and produced by the Dorai–Bhagavan duo. It is based on the novel of the same name by Bharathi Sutha.  The film starred Anant Nag, Kalpana and K. S. Ashwath. The film was a musical blockbuster with all songs composed by Rajan–Nagendra considered evergreen hits. Bayalu Daari was the first commercial success for Anant Nag, who had earlier done art films and established him as a leading star in the Kannada cinema with a chocolate hero image. This film was one of the last big hits of Kalpana. Ilayaraja was the guitar player for this movie.

Cast 
 Kalpana as Chandra
 Anant Nag as Gopu/Gopi
 Ashok
 Padma Kumta
 Jayalakshmi
 K. S. Ashwath
 Advani Lakshmi Devi
 Balakrishna

Production 
Director S. K. Bhagavan of the Dorai–Bhagavan duo had revealed that the movie was initially planned with Rajkumar. However, the idea was dropped because the movie was heroine-oriented and the protagonist seduces the girl before marriage which went against the veteran's star image at the time.

Soundtrack 
The music was composed by Rajan–Nagendra, with lyrics by Chi. Udaya Shankar. All the 4 songs composed for the film were received extremely well and considered as evergreen songs. The song Kanasalu Neene Manasalu Neene went on to be used in the 1982 Telugu movie Nalugu Stambhalata as Chinukula Rali and 1992 Hindi movie Deewana as Aisi Deewangi. The song Baanallu Neene was used in the 1977 Telugu movie Panthulamma as Sirimalle Neeve.

Awards 
 Karnataka State Film Award for Best Supporting Actress – Jayalakshmi

References

External links 
 

1977 films
Indian drama films
1970s Kannada-language films
Films scored by Rajan–Nagendra
Films based on Indian novels
1976 drama films
Films directed by Dorai–Bhagavan